The Providence Steamrollers were a Basketball Association of America team based in Providence, Rhode Island. As of 2023, the Steamrollers were the last professional sports franchise from one of the Big Four leagues to be based in Rhode Island.

Franchise history
The Steamrollers were one of the original eleven NBA franchises (when the league was called the Basketball Association of America).  The franchise posted an all-time record of 46–122 (.274) before folding after three seasons.

The Steamrollers still hold the dubious NBA record for the fewest games won in a season with six, in the 1947–48 season. However, the 2011–2012 Charlotte Bobcats hold the record for the lowest winning percentage in NBA history, with .106.  During that 1947–48 season, the Steamrollers' coach Nat Hickey activated himself as a player for two games, the second of which was two days before his 46th birthday, setting a still-standing record as the oldest player in NBA history.

Players of note
 Ernie Calverley – Second-team All-NBA and led league in assists during NBA's first season
 George Nostrand – Tallest player in the NBA's first year
 Howie Shannon – Leading NBA rookie in 1949
 Nat Hickey – Oldest player in NBA history
 Kenny Sailors – Led team in scoring in 1948 and 1949

Naismith Basketball Hall of Fame

Draft

Coaches and others
Robert Morris (1946–47)
Hank Soar (1947–48)
Nat Hickey (1948)
Ken Loeffler (1948–49)

Season-by-season records

References

External links
 Providence Steam Rollers history

 
Defunct National Basketball Association teams
Basketball Association of America teams
Basketball teams in Rhode Island
Sports in Providence, Rhode Island
Basketball teams established in 1946
Basketball teams disestablished in 1949
1946 establishments in Rhode Island
1949 disestablishments in Rhode Island